The Michael Essany Show is an American television talk show hosted by Michael Essany that aired on local, national, and international television from 1997 to 2004.  Hosted by Valparaiso, Indiana resident Michael Essany, the program was produced by Leeza Gibbons and broadcast for two seasons on E! Entertainment Television. Essany, a teenager when the show began, based the show on The Tonight Show Starring Johnny Carson.

The program featured such notable guests as Gerald Ford, Ray Romano, Kevin Bacon, Walter Cronkite, Carrot Top, Kelly Rowland, Michael Ian Black, Tom Green, Mila Kunis, "Weird Al" Yankovic, and Jay Leno.

References

1990s American television talk shows
2000s American television talk shows
E! original programming
1997 American television series debuts
2004 American television series endings
English-language television shows